Parul Gossain is a film publicist and media personality.

She has worked for many notable films such as Murder, Bluffmaster!, Gangster: A Love Story, Omkara, Guru, Robot-Enthiran,  Haider, Lipstick Under My Burkha, Sir, to name a few.

Parul started her career with MTV and then Channel V India. And in 2001 she handled channel V's Popstars: The Rivals Viva (band) and K3G. Mallika Sherawat as her first artiste client and worked with her on her controversial sassy image.  Parull also worked with Emraan Hashmi and was instrumental in creating his serial kisser image.

Later she worked for Kangana Ranaut for many years apart from many actors including Randeep Hooda.

Parul also worked as publicist to Sanjay Bhansali, Vishal Bhardwaj, Prakash Jha, Pritam and Shahid Kapoor.

Filmography 

Kabhi Khushi Kabhie Gham (2001)
Bas Yun Hi (2003)
Main Madhuri Dixit Banna Chahti Hoon (2003)
Waisa Bhi Hota Hai Part II (2003)
Murder (2004)
Zeher (2005)
Aashiq Banaya Aapne (2005)
Kalyug (2005)
Kal: Yesterday and Tomorrow (2005)
Bluffmaster! (2005)
Taxi No. 9211 (2006)
Gangster: A Love Story (2006)
Omkara (2006)
Khosla Ka Ghosla (2006)
Umrao Jaan (2006)
Guru (2007)
Manorama Six Feet Under (2007)
Johnny Gaddaar (2007)
Dil Dosti Etc (2007)
No Smoking (2007)
Saawariya (2007)
Khoya Khoya Chand (2007)
One Two Three (2008)
Ek Nadir Galpo: Tale of a River (2008)
Shaurya (2008)
Tahaan (2008)
Mere Baap Pehle Aap (2008)
Money Hai Toh Honey Hai (2008)
Rang Rasiya (2008)
The President Is Coming (2009)
Chandni Chowk to China (2009)
99 (2009)
Harishchandrachi Factory (2009)
Kaminey (2009)
Ishqiya (2010)
Hum Tum Aur Ghost (2010)
Raajneeti (2010)
Raavan (2010)
Enthiran (2010)
Guzaarish (2010)
No One Killed Jessica (2011)
Turning 30 (2011)
Yeh Saali Zindagi (2011)
7 Khoon Maaf (2011)
404: Error Not Found (2011)
Paan Singh Tomar (2012)
Tezz (2012)
Shanghai (2012)
Teri Meri Kahaani (2012)
Delhi Safari (2012)
Barfi! (2012)
Filmistaan (2012)
Chakravyuh (2012)
Matru Ki Bijlee Ka Mandola (2013)
Saheb, Biwi Aur Gangster Returns (2013)
Nautanki Saala! (2013)
Ek Thi Daayan (2013)
Lakshmi (2014)
Dedh Ishqiya (2014)
Hate Story 2 (2014)
Court (2014)
Haider (2014)
Dhanak (2015)
Ab Tak Chhappan 2 (2015)
Parched (2015)
Wedding Pullav (2015)
Hate Story 3 (2015)
Jugni (2016)
Sanam Teri Kasam (2016)
Jai Gangaajal (2016)
Buddha in a Traffic Jam (2016)
Hotel Salvation (2016)
Freaky Ali (2016)
A Death in the Gunj (2016)
Lipstick Under My Burkha (2016)

References

External links 

Living people

Year of birth missing (living people)